Parliamentary elections were held in French Togoland on 27 April 1958. The result was a victory for the Committee of Togolese Unity, which won 29 of the 46 seats in the Legislative Assembly. Voter turnout was 64.9%.

Results

Elected MPs

References

French Togoland parliamentary election
Parliamentary election
Elections in Togo
French Togoland parliamentary election